Dan Rebellato (born 1968) is an English dramatist and academic born in South London.

He is Professor of Contemporary Theatre at Royal Holloway, University of London and has written extensively for radio and the stage. He has twice been nominated for a Sony Award, and writes regularly for The Guardian Theatre Blog.

Stage plays 
Chekhov in Hell. 4–20 November 2010 at the Drum at the Theatre Royal, Plymouth, before transferring to the Soho Theatre, London 20 April-14 May 2011 
Beachy Head. Written with Emma Jowett and Lewis Hetherington. Analogue: Edinburgh Fringe Festival 2009; National Tour, 2011.
Static. 22 April-10 May 2008  at the Soho Theatre, London
Theatremorphosis. Part of the CCA Glasgow's Stage Fright event 4 April-23 May 2009.
Mile End. Analogue: Edinburgh Festival, 2007. International tour, 2007. Southwark Playhouse, 2008.
Here's What I Did With My Body One Day. Lightwork: Pleasance Theatre, London. National Tour, 2006.

Radio plays and adaptations
Negative Signs of Progress. BBC Radio 4, February 2013
My Life is a Series of People Saying Goodbye. BBC Radio 4, April 2011) 
And So Say All of Us. Written with Linda McLean and Duncan Macmillan. (First broadcast on BBC Radio 3 on 2 May 2010)
Girlfriend in a Coma. Adaptation of a Douglas Coupland novel by the same name. BBC Radio 3, February 2008.
Cavalry. BBC Radio 4, March 2008.
Dead Souls. Adaptation of novel by Nikolai Gogol. BBC Radio 4, April 2006.
The Midwich Cuckoos. Adaptation of novel by John Wyndham. BBC Radio 4, November 2003. [Released as a BBC Audiobook 2007]

Notable publications

1956 and all That, London: Routledge, 1999.
Static, London: Oberon Books,  2008.
Theatre & Globalization, Basingstoke: Palgrave, 2009.
Contemporary European Theatre Directors, co-edited with Maria M. Delgado, London: Routledge, 2010.
Chekhov in Hell, London: Oberon, 2010 (rev. ed. 2011).
Beachy Head, co-written with Emma Jowett and Lewis Hetherington. London: Oberon, 2011.
The Suspect Culture Book co-edited with Graham Eatough, London: Oberon, 2011.
Modern British Playwriting 2000-2009: Voices, Documents, New Interpretations London: Methuen Drama, 2013.

References

External links 
 Royal Holloway profile
 Personal Site and blog
 Twitter profile

1968 births
Academics of Royal Holloway, University of London
Alumni of the University of Bristol
People educated at the City of London School
English dramatists and playwrights
Living people
English male dramatists and playwrights